Thomas Wensing (born May 1, 1978, in Cologne) is a German author of poetry and short stories.

Life and works 
Thomas Wensing, born 1978 in Cologne (North Rhine-Westphalia) has studied at the University of Cologne and at the Catholic University of Eichstätt-Ingolstadt. He obtained his PhD from the latter institution in 2011.

Besides studies and occupation, Wensing developed skills in writing literary texts. Since the late 1990s, he has been publishing poetry in a couple of anthologies, e.g. in Junge Lyrik, Junge Lyrik II and Junge Lyrik III, a book series published by Martin Werhand Verlag. In 2006, he participated in the visual-poetric project Poesie bewegt of the Bremer Straßenbahn AG under supervision of Joachim Tuz. Together with the two musicians Martin Schmitz and Michael Wurzel, Wensing formed the trio eher selten that performed poetry and music at various occasions in the mid-2000s. Apart from that group, he tried out his texts in several other formats, e.g. in cooperation with the Stadttheater Ingolstadt.

In August 2014 Martin Werhand Verlag published Wensings first own volume of poems (Mitschrift), within the series 100 Gedichte. A volume of short stories (Zwischenspiel) appeared in late 2015 in the same publishing house. In December 2019 the MWV published a third book with poems (Herbsttag), within the series 50 Gedichte.

Selected publications

Monographies 
 Periodic Review Inventory Systems. Performance Analysis and Optimization of Inventory Systems within Supply Chains. Springer, Berlin 2011, 152 p. .
 Mitschrift. 100 Gedichte. Martin Werhand Verlag, Melsbach 2014, 190 p. .
 Zwischenspiel. Kurzgeschichten. Martin Werhand Verlag, Melsbach 2015, 258 p. .
 Herbsttag. 50 Gedichte. Martin Werhand Verlag, Melsbach 2019, 120 p. .

Anthologies 
 Junge Lyrik – 50 Dichterinnen und Dichter. Anthology, Martin Werhand Verlag, Melsbach 1999, .
 Junge Lyrik II – 50 Dichterinnen und Dichter. Anthology, Martin Werhand Verlag, Melsbach 2000, .
 Junge Lyrik III – 50 Dichterinnen und Dichter. Anthology, Martin Werhand Verlag, Melsbach 2002, . Also second, revised edition.

Literature (selection) 
 Thomas Wensing in: Frank-Uwe Orbons: Die Gedanken gingen auf Wanderschaft, Kölner Stadt-Anzeiger, 12. April 2005
 Thomas Wensing in: Melanie Nicolai: Gute Unterhaltung ist ihnen wichtig, Kölner Stadt-Anzeiger, 21. February 2006
 Thomas Wensing in: Raffinierte Lyrik und experimentelle Performance, Donaukurier, 2. April 2006
 Thomas Wensing in: Tradition und Moderne, Donaukurier, 18. April 2010
 Thomas Wensing in: Aus der Zeitlosigkeit des Kellers, Donaukurier, 15. June 2010
 Thomas Wensing In: Nicolai Riedel Bibliographisches Handbuch der deutschsprachigen Lyrik 1945–2020, Metzler, Heidelberg, 2023, S. 976,

See also

References

External links 
 Official website of Thomas Wensing 
 
 Thomas Wensing in: NRW Literatur im Netz 
 Thomas Wensing in WorldCat

1978 births
Living people
German-language poets
German male poets
20th-century German poets
Writers from Cologne
People from the Rhine Province
University of Cologne alumni
University of Ingolstadt alumni
21st-century German poets
21st-century German male writers
20th-century German male writers